Guru Balakdas (18 August 1805 — 17 March 1860) was son of the founder of the Satnampanth, Guru Ghasidas. Guru Balakdas' activities aroused the hostility of high-cast Hindu populace and he was assaulted by attackers carrying daggers at a rest-house in Aurabandha village of Bilaspur and died at the village of Kosa in March 1860.

References 

Satnami
People from Raipur district
1805 births
1860 deaths
People murdered in India
Dalit religious leaders